Lake Kerkini ( - Limni Kerkini) is an artificial reservoir in Central Macedonia, Greece that was created in 1932, and then redeveloped in 1980, on the site of what was previously an extremely extensive marshland.

Lake Kerkini is now one of the premier birdwatching sites in Greece, as it is situated along the migratory flyway for birds en route to the Aegean Sea, the Balkan region, the Black Sea, the Hungarian steppes and beyond.

History 
Before 1932, there were irregular marsh lakes on Strymon, one of them called "Podkova" (in Bulgarian and Slavic Macedonian "Podkova" meaning "Horseshoe", found in Ottoman Turkish records: ݒودقوه كولي Podkova Gölü.).

Kerkini lake was created by making embankments on the eastern and western sides of the river and by a dam constructed near the village of Lithotopos, which started functioning in 1932.

As time went by, the lake's capacity was reduced due to silt deposited by Strymon river. So the raising of the embankments and the construction of a new dam was necessary, which started operating in 1982.

Geography 
The lake's main water source is the Strymon River, although it is also fed by the Kerkinitis river from Krousia. 

The lake's surrounding area is flat and semi-mountainous. The lake's size varies from 54 km2 to 72 km2. 

The lake is a technical work of great agricultural utility and provides a hydrobiosphere for thousands of water fowls.

Nature 
This biosphere is recouped by the International Convention of Ramsar and presents numerous admirable elements. Thousands of birds, both rare and protected, riverside forests, water-lilies in a large area, fish variety and fantastic panoramic view from the mountains of Belasica and Krousia give it a characteristic tone. Actually the lake hosts 227 kinds of birds, especially non-migrants, of which 76 are recorded in the National Red Catalogue, while at least 31 of them are protected by EEC's Directive concerning wild life. What makes an exceptional presence is the buffalo's herd in the area, plus the one of the jackelo in the area of Lake Kerkini. In the surrounding area of Lake Kerkini there are at least 10 amphibian species (frogs, salamanders, newts, five snail species, 19 reptile species (lizards, snakes, turtles) and a great variety of insects which play an important part in the food chain and contribute towards the biological resources of the lake.

The human intervention usually retracts or takes negative action against the natural processes. Lake Kerkini is a rare example, where the gentle human handling has had the exact opposite result.

Gallery

References

External links 

 Harvard University Library, Rumeli-i Şahane Haritası
 Lake Kerkini: A Greek Wonderland

Landforms of Central Macedonia
Landforms of Serres (regional unit)
Tourist attractions in Central Macedonia
Kerkini
Ramsar sites in Greece
Natura 2000 in Greece